Navketan Films is a film production house based in Mumbai, India. Started in 1949 by actor-director and producer Dev Anand and his elder brother Chetan Anand, whose debut film, Neecha Nagar, received the Palme d'Or (Best Film) award, at the first ever Cannes Film Festival in 1946. Younger brother Vijay Anand, also directed numerous films for the company, like Guide (1965), Jewel Thief (1967) and Johny Mera Naam (1970). Chetan and Vijay parted ways with company later and today Dev's son Suneil Anand is currently heading the production house. The last film released by Navketan films was Chargesheet in 2011.  Navketan’s latest venture is a Hollywood film titled Vagator Mixer (2023) which is being directed by Suneil Anand. It stars Suneil in the lead with a host of Hollywood actors.

Filmography

References 

 Romancing With Life, An Autobiography, by Dev Anand. Penguin/ Viking, 2007. .
 Cinema Modern: Navketan Story, by Sidharth Bhatia. Harpercollins, 2011. .

External links
 Navketan Films, Official website
 Navketan Films at Internet Movie Database
 Navketan Films at Bollywood Hungama

Mass media companies established in 1949
Film production companies based in Mumbai
Hindi cinema
Indian companies established in 1949